Thomas Sugden was an English professional association footballer who played as a goalkeeper. He played seven matches in the Football League for Burnley in the 1901–02 season.

References

English footballers
Association football goalkeepers
Burnley F.C. players
English Football League players
Year of death missing
Year of birth missing